Marquis Wu of Jin, Ancestral name is Ji (姬), given name is Ningzu (寧族), was the third ruler of the state of Jin during the Western Zhou Dynasty. After his father, Xie, Marquis of Jin died, he ascended the throne of Jin. After he died, his son, Furen, ascended the throne as the next ruler of Jin: Marquis Cheng of Jin.

References

Monarchs of Jin (Chinese state)